is a former Japanese badminton player. She was part of the Sanko Co, Ltd team. Nagamine graduated from the Kumamotoshinaijogakuin Chugakukoto School, and in 2000, she competed at the Summer Olympics in Sydney, Australia in the women's doubles event partnered with Satomi Igawa. Together with Igawa, they won international tournament in Cuba, Netherlands, Peru, and Chile.

Achievements

IBF International
Women's doubles

References

External links
 
 
 
 

1979 births
Living people
Sportspeople from Miyazaki Prefecture
Japanese female badminton players
Olympic badminton players of Japan
Badminton players at the 2000 Summer Olympics